Zappi may refer to
Monte Zappi, a peak in central Italy
Daniela Cristina Zappi (born 1965), Brazilian botanist
Ettore Zappi (1904–1986), Italian-American mafiosi 
Faustina Maratti Zappi (c. 1679–1745), Italian Baroque poet and painter
Giambattista Felice Zappi (1667–1719), Italian poet
Werner "Zappi" Diermaier, German drummer
Italian-language surnames